Lloyd, also called Grover, Mott Town, Mottown, and Mottstown, is a former settlement in Portage County, Ohio, United States. It was located in along present-day Williams Road in southeastern Palmyra Township.

A post office called Lloyd was established in 1887, and remained in operation until 1920.

Notes

Unincorporated communities in Portage County, Ohio
Unincorporated communities in Ohio